Kamchatka Time or Petropavlovsk Time (PETT; , kamchatskoye vremya), also known as Anadyr Time (ANAT), is a time zone in Russia, named after the Kamchatka Peninsula. It is 12 hours ahead of UTC (UTC+12:00) and 9 hours ahead of Moscow Time (MSK+9). This time zone is used in the two easternmost regions of Russia after October 2014 and was also used before the time zone reform of 2010.

Kamchatka Summer Time (PETST) corresponded to UTC+13:00, but still 9 hours ahead of Moscow (MSD+9). This no longer exists as explained below.

On 28 March 2010, while most regions of Russia switched to Summer Time moving the clocks one hour forward, the two Russian regions using Kamchatka Time, Kamchatka Krai and Chukotka Autonomous Okrug, retained UTC+12:00, effectively joining Magadan Summer Time. Between 2011 and 2014 Russia observed "permanent" DST. When time in most of Russia was moved one hour back in October 2014, a separate MSK+9 time zone was reinstated but Daylight Saving Time was not re-introduced.

Main cities:
Petropavlovsk-Kamchatsky
Anadyr
Vilyuchinsk
Yelizovo

See also
Time in Russia

References

Time zones
Time in Russia